Mundo de fieras may refer to:
 Mundo de fieras (Venezuelan TV series), 1991-1992
 Mundo de fieras (Mexican TV series), 2006-2007